The Convent Church of Santo Domingo de Guzmán is a Roman Catholic church within the jurisdiction of the Roman Catholic Archdiocese of Puebla de los Angeles, with the archangel Michael as its patron saint. Attached to it is the Chapel of the Rosario, an example of New Spanish Baroque, considered in its time to be the "eighth wonder of the world". The church is located in Puebla's historic centre.

See also
Chapel of the Rosario, Puebla
List of buildings in Puebla City

References

External links 

Roman Catholic churches in Puebla (city)
1610s establishments in Mexico 
1611 establishments in New Spain
Baroque church buildings in Puebla
Roman Catholic churches in Mexico
Spanish Colonial architecture in Mexico
Historic centre of Puebla
17th-century Roman Catholic church buildings in Mexico